Idris Williams (19 (or 9) April 1836 – 4 November 1894) was an educationalist, prominent Congregationalist, and Liberal councillor for the Cymmer division of the Glamorgan County Council, South Wales.

Early life
Idris Williams was born at Porth Farm on 19 (or 9) April 1836, the third and youngest son of Edward and Jane Williams. At that time, Rhondda was a remote, rural backwater. During his lifetime, Williams witnessed the transformation of the valley into a thriving industrial community. Williams received very little formal education and at the age of nine he went to work as a haulier at George Insole & Son's Cymmer Colliery. At the age of sixteen he was sent to a school in Cardiff and two years later became an apprentice carpenter at Pontypridd. After completing his training he returned to the Cymmer Pit to work as a carpenter in 1854–5. In 1855 he was married to Mary Evans, daughter of the Rev. Joshua Evans of Cymmer. They had six children.

Public life

Williams supported William Abraham (Mabon) during his successful campaign for election to Parliament in 1885 as Liberal-Labour MP for Rhondda. In 1892 Williams became a Liberal councillor for the Cymmer division of the Glamorgan County Council. Although he lost the popular election he took up the position unopposed a month later when the winning candidate became an alderman.

Richard Griffiths, in his study of the commercial life of the Rhondda, speculates that Williams' prominence in the public life of the Rhondda Valley was based on two factors. The first was his connection with the pre-industrial society of the valley as the heir to Porth Farm, an agricultural holding that disappeared with the advent of industrialisation (although the former farmhouse, where his younger brother Levi Williams lived, survived next to the railway station in the centre of Porth). The second factor was the considerable wealth that he accrued after coal mining operations commenced on the land which formerly formed part of the Porth Farm.

Death and legacy 
Williams died suddenly in Porth on 4 November 1894 and was buried four days later at the Cymmer Independent Chapel graveyard after "a vast concourse of people [had] assembled to pay their last tokens of respect and esteem."

References

External links

Related newspaper and other articles 
Relieving Officer (1860): unsuccessfully sought election as relieving officer for the Rhondda district 
Pontypridd Board of Governors (1869): elected as relieving officer
Pentre Rhondda (1877): registrar of marriages
Llanwonno (1877): school board election
Ystradyfodwg Burial Board (1879): board member
Congregational Association East Glamorganshire (1880): meeting chair
Glamorgan County Council Election – Cymmer Division (1892): letter to the Editor and response
 Glamorgan County Council Triennial Election 1892. Cymmer District (Rhondda) (1892): letter to council electors
 News in Brief (1892): chosen to replace elected councillor
 Rhondda Intermediate School (1892): committee vice-president
 Birmingham Water Bill (1892): Glamorgan Water Committee activity
 Up and Down the Valley (1892): Porth and District Chamber of Trade meeting
 Sad Scene in a Rhondda Chapel (1894): further details of death; councillor and assistant overseer and registrar of marriages of the parish of Ystradyfodwg
 Late Mr Idris Williams (1894): representatives of various groups at the funeral
Er Cof am y Diweddar (In Memory of the Late) (1894): song written by Joseph Parry for and sung at the funeral
 The Late Mr. Williams, Porth (1894): condolence votes from the Rhondda and Pontypridd executive of the National Union of Teachers and the guardians of the Pontypridd Union
 Congregationalism (1894): condolence letter from English Congregational Union of Glamorganshire and Carmarthenshire
 The Late Mr Idris Williams (1894): death noted by East Glamorgan Liberal Association

Members of Glamorgan County Council
1836 births
1894 deaths
People from Porth